INEC Rivers State Branch Office is the branch of the Independent National Electoral Commission that organizes, undertakes and supervises elections to federal and state executive as well as legislative government offices in Rivers State. It is led by a Resident Electoral Commissioner (REC), currently Obo Effanga.

INEC Rivers State Branch Office is specifically located at Plot 236, Aba Road, Port Harcourt.

List of RECs
Gesila Khan
Aniedi Ikoiwak
 Obo Effanga (April 2018 to date)

See also
Rivers State Independent Electoral Commission
Independent National Electoral Commission

References

External links

Buildings and structures in Rivers State
Organizations based in Rivers State